Sevkar is a village in the Adaklı District, Bingöl Province, Turkey. The village is populated by Kurds of the Çarekan tribe and had a population of 371 in 2021.

The hamlets of Arzu, Bahar, Çem, Çiçekli, Dere, Dikmen, Kavak, Mehmet, Sevkor and Yasin are attached to the village.

References 

Villages in Adaklı District
Kurdish settlements in Bingöl Province